Linda Stephens is an American lawyer who formerly served as an associate judge on the North Carolina Court of Appeals.  She was first appointed to the Court of Appeals by Gov. Mike Easley (D-NC) in January 2006 and lost her seat in the general election of November 2006. Gov. Easley then reappointed her to the Court of Appeals in January 2007 to fill the seat vacated by the election of Robin Hudson to the NC Supreme Court.  Judge Stephens won a full term in a non-partisan election on November 4, 2008.  Her opponent for the seat was Dan Barrett, an attorney and author from Davie County.

Linda Stephens' 2008 candidacy had the endorsement of the NC National Organization for Women, EqualityNC, the Muslim-American PAC, The Black Political Caucus of Charlotte-Mecklenburg, North Carolina Association of Defense Attorneys, NC Academy of Trial Lawyers, and NC Association of Women Attorneys.

Stephens was defeated in her bid for re-election in 2016 by Phil Berger, Jr. She ran as a Democrat.

Stephens is a magna cum laude graduate of the University of South Carolina and received her J.D. degree from the University of North Carolina at Chapel Hill.

External links
Judge Stephens' Web Site
Judge Stephens' Facebook Page
North Carolina Court System
Charlotte Observer endorses Stephens and others for Court of Appeals

North Carolina Court of Appeals judges
Living people
Year of birth missing (living people)
University of South Carolina alumni
University of North Carolina School of Law alumni
American women judges
21st-century American women